Animal Instinct is the ninth studio album by British heavy metal band Tygers of Pan Tang, released on 12 April 2008.

Track listing

Personnel 
Jacopo Meille – vocals
Dean Robertson – lead guitar
Robb Weir – guitars; voicebox (tracks 1, 5), lead guitar (tracks 4-6, 10)
Brian West – bass
Craig Ellis – drums

References

2008 albums
Tygers of Pan Tang albums